Fazu Aliyeva (5 December 1932 – 1 January 2016) was an Avar-speaking Soviet-born Russian poet, novelist and journalist. She played a significant role in the development of Dagestani in Russian literature. She was also a human rights activist.

Overview 
Aliyeva was born in the Khunzakhsky District of Dagestan.

From 1954-1955, Fazu Aliyeva studied at Dagestan State Pedagogical University.

In 1961 she graduated from the Maxim Gorky Literature Institute.

She was a member of the Union of Soviet Writers as well as the Civic Chamber of the Russian Federation (until 2006).

Aliyeva was awarded two Orders of the "Badge of Honor", two Orders of Friendship of Peoples and the Order of St. Andrew in 2002. She was awarded the Gold Medal of the Soviet Peace Fund, the Jubilee Medal of the World Peace Council, and honorary awards in several foreign countries.

Aliyeva died in Makhachkala, Dagestan, Russia, on 1 January 2016, from heart failure at the age of 83.

References

External links
 Biography 
 Fazu Aliyeva poetry at Stihipoeta.ru

1932 births
2016 deaths
Russian women poets
Russian women novelists
Russian human rights activists
Women human rights activists
Avar people
Russian women journalists
20th-century Russian poets
20th-century Russian novelists
20th-century Russian women writers
21st-century Russian writers
21st-century Russian poets
21st-century Russian novelists
21st-century Russian women writers
Poets from Dagestan
Writers from Dagestan
Recipients of the Order of Friendship of Peoples
People from Khunzakhsky District
Members of the Civic Chamber of the Russian Federation
Soviet poets
Soviet novelists
Maxim Gorky Literature Institute alumni